The  was an electric multiple unit (EMU) train type for Chichibuji express services operated by Chichibu Railway in Japan from 1992 to 2006.

History
Three 3-car trains were converted in 1992 from former JR East 165 series EMUs built in 1965, with the first set entering service in April 1992, and the second set entering service in June of the same year. Conversion involved sealing the end gangways, adding new headlight clusters, and removing the toilets. The trains were later replaced by 6000 series EMUs, and the last train in service was withdrawn in November 2006 and cut up by January 2007.

Formations
The three 3-car sets were formed as shown below.

References

Electric multiple units of Japan
Train-related introductions in 1992
Chichibu Railway
1500 V DC multiple units of Japan